Mochizuki (望月) is a Japanese surname. Notable people with the surname include:

 Mochizuki Chiyome (c. late 16th century), noblewoman
 Hiroo Mochizuki (born 1936), martial artist
 Hisayo Mochizuki (born 1978), voice actress
 Horace Yomishi Mochizuki (1937-1989), mathematician
 Isamu Mochizuki (1906-1944), flying ace
 Jun Mochizuki, manga artist
 Mochizuki Keisuke (1867-1941), cabinet minister in the Taisho and early Showa periods
 Masaaki Mochizuki (born 1970), professional wrestler
 Minetarō Mochizuki (born 1961), manga artist
 Minoru Mochizuki (1907-2003), martial artist
, Japanese gymnast
, Japanese footballer
 Rokurō Mochizuki (born 1957), film director
 Saya Mochizuki (born 1976), model
 Shigeyoshi Mochizuki (born 1973), association football player
 Shinichi Mochizuki (born 1969), mathematician
 Shintaro Mochizuki (born 2003), tennis player
, Japanese pole vaulter
 Susumu Mochizuki (born 1978), professional wrestler
 Takurō Mochizuki (born 1972), mathematician
 Tatsuya Mochizuki (born 1963), association football player
 Tomomi Mochizuki (born 1958), anime director and producer
 , Japanese actor and voice actor

Fictional characters
 Mochizuki Honami, a character in the game Hatsune Miku: Colorful Stage!
 Mochizuki Rokurō, member of the Sanada Ten Braves
 Sokaku Mochizuki, from the Fatal Fury series
 Mochizuki Minato from Tsukipro
 Mochizuki Tōya, the protagonist of In Another World with My Smartphone

See also
 Mochizuki-shuku
 Mochizuki, Nagano
 Mochizuki, destroyer

References 

Japanese-language surnames